Eileen Evelyn Greer Garson  (29 September 1904 – 6 April 1996) was a British-American actress and singer. She was a major star at Metro-Goldwyn-Mayer who became popular during the Second World War for her portrayal of strong women on the homefront; listed by the Motion Picture Herald as one of America's top-ten box office draws from 1942 to 1946.

The fourth most-nominated woman for the Best Actress Oscar, Garson received seven Academy Award nominations, including a record-tying (with Bette Davis) five consecutive nominations (1941–1945) in the actress category, winning for her performance in the title role of the 1942 film Mrs. Miniver.

Early life
Greer Garson was born on 29 September 1904 in Manor Park, East Ham (then in Essex, now part of Greater London), the only child of Nancy Sophia "Nina" (née Greer; 1880–1958) and George Garson (1865–1906), a commercial clerk in a London importing business. Her father was born in London to Scottish parents, and her mother was born at Drumalore (usually spelled as Drumalure or Drumaloor), a townland near Belturbet in County Cavan, Ireland. The name Greer is a contraction of MacGregor, another family name.

Her maternal grandfather David Greer ( 1848-1913 from Kilrea, County Londonderry), was an RIC sergeant stationed in Castlewellan, County Down. In the 1870s or 1880s he became a land steward to the wealthy Annesley family, who built the town of Castlewellan. While there, he lived in a large detached house called "Clairemount", which was built on the lower part of what was known as Pig Street, or locally known as the Back Way, near Shilliday's builder's yard. It was often erroneously reported Greer Garson was born there (The Macmillan International Film Encyclopedia gives her place of birth as County Down, and year of birth as 1908).

Garson read French and 18th-century literature at King's College London and did her postgraduate studies at the University of Grenoble. While aspiring to be an actress, she was appointed head of the research library of LINTAS in the marketing department of Lever Brothers. Her co-worker there, George Sanders, wrote in his autobiography that it was Garson who suggested he take up a career in acting.

Career
Garson's early professional appearances were on stage, starting at Birmingham Repertory Theatre in January 1932, when she was 27 years old. She appeared on television during its earliest years (the late 1930s), most notably starring in a 30-minute production of an excerpt of Twelfth Night in May 1937, with Dorothy Black. These live transmissions were part of the BBC's experimental service from Alexandra Palace, and this is the first known instance of a Shakespeare play performed on television. In 1936, she appeared in the West End in Charles Bennett's play Page From a Diary, and Noël Coward's play Mademoiselle.

Louis B. Mayer discovered Garson while he was in London looking for new talent. Garson was signed to a contract with MGM in late 1937. The actress suffered a back injury during her first 18 months at MGM while waiting for a role Mayer deemed worthy of her, and was nearly released from her contract.

She began work on her first film, Goodbye, Mr. Chips, in late 1938. She received her first Oscar nomination for the role, but lost to Vivien Leigh for Gone with the Wind. She received critical acclaim the next year for her role as Elizabeth Bennet in the 1940 film Pride and Prejudice.

Garson starred with Joan Crawford in When Ladies Meet, a 1941 poorly received and sanitized re-make of a pre-Code 1933 film of the same name, which had starred Ann Harding and Myrna Loy. That same year, she became a major box-office star with the sentimental Technicolor drama Blossoms in the Dust, which brought her the first of five consecutive Best Actress Oscar nominations, tying Bette Davis's 1938–1942 record, which still stands.

Garson starred in two Academy Award-nominated films in 1942, Mrs. Miniver and Random Harvest. She won the Academy for Best Actress for her performance as a strong British wife and mother protecting the homefront during the Second World War in Mrs. Miniver, which co-starred Walter Pidgeon. The Guinness Book of World Records credits her with the longest Oscar acceptance speech, at five minutes and 30 seconds, after which the Academy Awards instituted a time limit.

In Random Harvest, she co-starred with Ronald Colman. The drama received seven Academy Award nominations, including Colman for Best Actor and Best Picture, but Garson was ineligible, as she had already been nominated that year for Mrs. Miniver. The American Film Institute ranked it #36 on its list of 100 Greatest Love Stories of All Time, and it was one of Garson's favorite films.

Garson also received Oscar nominations for her performances in the films Madame Curie (1943), Mrs. Parkington (1944), and The Valley of Decision (1945). She frequently co-starred with Walter Pidgeon, ultimately making eight pictures with him: Blossoms in the Dust (1941), Mrs. Miniver (1942), Madame Curie, Mrs. Parkington, Julia Misbehaves (1948), That Forsyte Woman (1949), The Miniver Story (1950), and Scandal at Scourie (1953).

Garson was partnered with Clark Gable after his return from war service in Adventure (1945). The film was advertised with the catch-phrase "Gable's back, and Garson's got him!" Gable argued for "He put the Arson in Garson"; she countered with "She put the Able in Gable!"; thereafter, the safer catchphrase was selected.

She injured her back again while filming Desire Me in Monterey on 26 April 1946 when a wave knocked her and co-star Richard Hart from the rocks where they were rehearsing. A local fisherman and a film extra rescued Garson from the surf and potential undertow. She was bruised and in shock and required by doctors to rest for several days. The injury to her back would require several surgeries over the coming years.

Garson's popularity declined somewhat in the late 1940s, but she remained a prominent film star until the mid-1950s. In 1951, she became a naturalised citizen of the United States. She made only a few films after her MGM contract expired in 1954. In 1958, she received a warm reception on Broadway in Auntie Mame, replacing Rosalind Russell, who had gone to Hollywood to make the film version. In 1960, Garson received her seventh and final Oscar nomination for Sunrise at Campobello, playing Eleanor Roosevelt, this time losing to Elizabeth Taylor for BUtterfield 8.

Greer was a special guest on an episode of the TV series Father Knows Best, playing herself. On 4 October 1956, Garson appeared with Reginald Gardiner as the first two guest stars of the series in the premiere of NBC's The Ford Show, Starring Tennessee Ernie Ford. She appeared as a mystery guest on What's My Line on 25 October 1953 and again on 6 April 1958 to promote her appearance on stage in Auntie Mame. She also served as a panelist rather than a guest on the What's My Line episode which aired on 12 May 1957.

She returned to MGM for a role in The Singing Nun (1966), starring Debbie Reynolds. Her last film appearance was in the 1967 Walt Disney feature The Happiest Millionaire, although she made infrequent television appearances afterwards. In 1968, she narrated the children's television special The Little Drummer Boy. Her final role for television was in a 1982 episode of The Love Boat.

Personal life
Garson was married three times. Her first marriage, on 28 September 1933, was to Edward Alec Abbot Snelson (1904–1992), later Sir Edward, a British civil servant who became a noted judge and expert in Indian affairs. After a honeymoon in Germany, he returned to his appointment at Nagpur, a town in central India, and she chose to return to her mother and the theatre in Britain. Snelson reportedly grieved at losing her and would watch multiple screenings of any film of hers that played in Nagpur. The marriage was not formally dissolved until 1943.

Her second marriage, on 24 July 1943, was to Richard Ney (1916–2004), a young actor who had played her son in Mrs. Miniver. The relationship was under constant scrutiny owing to their 12-year age difference. MGM claimed that Garson was merely three years older than Ney and tried to portray them as a happy couple, but the marriage was troubled. They divorced in 1947, after several attempts at reconciliation. Ney eventually became a stock-market analyst, financial consultant, and author.

Her third marriage in 1949, was to millionaire Texas oilman and horse breeder, E.E. "Buddy" Fogelson (1900–1987). In 1967, the couple retired to their Forked Lightning Ranch in New Mexico. They purchased the US Hall of Fame champion Thoroughbred Ack Ack from the estate of Harry F. Guggenheim in 1971, and were successful as breeders. They also maintained a home in Dallas, where Garson funded the Greer Garson Theatre at Southern Methodist University. She founded a permanent endowment for the Fogelson Honors Forum at Texas Christian University (TCU), Buddy Fogelson's alma mater, in nearby Fort Worth.

In 1951, Garson became a dual citizen of the United Kingdom and the United States. She was a registered Republican and in 1966 was asked to run for Congress on the Republican ticket against Democrat Earle Cabell but declined.  She was a devout Presbyterian.

During her later years, Garson was recognised for her philanthropy and civic leadership. She donated several million dollars for the construction of the Greer Garson Theatre at both the Santa Fe University of Art and Design and at Southern Methodist University's Meadows School of the Arts on three conditions: 1) the stages be circular, 2) the premiere production be A Midsummer Night's Dream, and 3) they have large ladies' rooms.

Death
Garson lived her final years in a penthouse suite at the Presbyterian Hospital of Dallas, where she died from heart failure on 6 April 1996, at the age of 91. She is interred beside her husband in the Sparkman-Hillcrest Memorial Park Cemetery in Dallas.

Honours
Garson received an honorary Doctor of Arts degree from Southern Methodist University in 1991.

In 1993, Queen Elizabeth II recognised Garson's achievements by investing her as Commander of the Order of the British Empire (CBE).

Garson received a star on the Hollywood Walk of Fame on 8 February 1960 located at 1651 Vine Street in Los Angeles, CA.

Filmography

Awards and nominations
Garson won an Academy Award out of 7 nominations for Best Actress, including the most consecutive nominations, from 1941 to 1945, tied with Bette Davis.

Garson was recognized by the Academy of Motion Picture Arts and Sciences for the following performances:

Box office ranking

Television appearances

Radio appearances

References

Sources

External links

 
 
 
 
 
 
 
 The New York Times obituary
 Forked Lightning Ranch, Pecos National Historical Park
 Everything About Greer Garson fan website
 Image of Roddy McDowall, Julie Andrews and Greer Garson at the premiere of "The Greatest Story Ever Told" in Los Angeles, California, 1965. Los Angeles Times Photographic Archive (Collection 1429). UCLA Library Special Collections, Charles E. Young Research Library, University of California, Los Angeles.

1904 births
1996 deaths
English film actresses
English stage actresses
English television actresses
Actresses from London
Actresses from the Golden Age of Hollywood
British emigrants to the United States
Best Actress Academy Award winners
Best Drama Actress Golden Globe (film) winners
Alumni of King's College London
Commanders of the Order of the British Empire
English Presbyterians
People from Manor Park, London
English people of Irish descent
English people of Scottish descent
People with acquired American citizenship
20th-century English actresses
Grenoble Alpes University alumni
Metro-Goldwyn-Mayer contract players
Burials at Sparkman-Hillcrest Memorial Park Cemetery
California Republicans
Texas Republicans